Jotei is rōmaji, a romanization of words in the Japanese language. It may refer to:

 empress (jotei)
 The Empress, a tarot card
 Shangdi or God (Jōtei)